Dritan Babamusta (born 6 September 1981) is an Albanian former footballer who played as a midfielder.

He has been capped once for Albania.

Club career
On 5 August 2006, Babamusta was released by Dinamo Tirana in a move which was dubbed a surprise by Albanian media.

Babamusta announced his retirement from football on 16 September 2012 after more than two years without playing. A small ceremony was held in his honour before the start of the league match against Tirana.

International career
Babamusta earned his first and last international cap 13 March 2002 by starting in the 4–0 loss to Mexico.

Honours
Besa Kavajë
 Albanian Cup: 2009–10

References

External links
FSHF profile

1981 births
Living people
Footballers from Durrës
Albanian footballers
Association football midfielders
Albania under-21 international footballers
Albania international footballers
KF Teuta Durrës players
FK Dinamo Tirana players
FK Partizani Tirana players
Besa Kavajë players
Kategoria Superiore players